Santa Anita is a station on the Mexico City Metro. Located in Mexico City's Iztacalco borough, the station is the current terminal of Line 4.

General information
The station logo depicts a man sailing a canoe. This is because in the early 20th century, in the area where the station now stands, was the Santa Anita canal – a place used for  chinampa-based agriculture. Today the canal has long since vanished, but the name Santa Anita is still used by the surrounding neighborhood.

Metro Line 4 was originally projected to end in the Villa Coapa neighborhood, in the southern borough of Coyoacán. Since the inauguration of Line B, however, no more lines have been constructed or extended, so Metro Santa Anita – and other stations, such as  Metro Barranca del Muerto – officially remain provisional terminals. Metro Santa Anita is the least busy station on the Mexico City Metro, with only 621,867 passenger boardings in 2008.

Santa Anita was originally to be named "Plutarco E. Calles", in honor of President Plutarco Elías Calles, according to early plans for Line 4.

Ridership

Exits

Line 4
Avenida Congreso de la Unión between Canal Nacional street and Viaducto Miguel Alemán, Colonia Santa Anita

Line 8
East: Avenida Coyuya and Viaducto Miguel Alemán, Colonia Santa Anita
West: Avenida Coyuya and Viaducto Miguel Alemán, Colonia Santa Anita

References

External links 
 

Santa Anita
Railway stations opened in 1982
1982 establishments in Mexico
Railway stations opened in 1994
1994 establishments in Mexico
Mexico City Metro stations in Iztacalco
Mexico City Metro Line 8 stations